OrbQuest: The Search For Seven Wards is a computer game developed by QWare, Inc. for the Apple Macintosh.

Plot
OrbQuest is an adventure/fantasy role-playing game that revolves around a powerful, mystic object called the Orb, which has been shattered into seven pieces called Wards. The seven Wards were scattered, each located in one of the seven corners of the world, housed in a pyramid. King Cricken accidentally destroyed the Orb when casting magics to defeat the Evil Ones (sending them back to their netherworld), and then disappeared in a flash of thunder. The forces of Evil were weakened that day, but they have started to become powerful once again. It is up to the player to take over King Cricken's quest by finding the pieces of the Orb and reassemble this powerful device to put a stop to the spread of Evil.

Gameplay
The onscreen character's movement is controlled using a mouse, moving the mouse in the direction the player wishes the adventurer to move. By positioning the character over a city, town, or pyramid, the player double-clicks the mouse button with the cursor placed on top of the character. This opens the "gates" of the city, and the screen environment changes to that of the locale's interior. Movement via the mouse moves the character to the taverns, grocery stores, armories, weaponry shops, magic shops, and temples within a city. A game in progress can only be saved while the character is in a town or city.

When confronted by an opponent, the player places the character next to the monster, positions the cursor over the beastie, and presses the mouse "fire" button. A message appears on screen to inform the player of the damage inflicted upon both the creature and the character in the exchange of blows. The character has the attributes of Strength, Intelligence, Wisdom, Dexterity, Charisma and Constitution, each of which is determined randomly by the computer, although the player can reroll as many times as desired. The player can play either an old character or create a new one when booting the game. The player selects class, gender, and race. The three player classes are fighter, spellcaster, and thief, and for race elf, dwarf, halfling, half-orc, and human are all available.

Development
OrbQuest was developed for the Apple Macintosh computer by QWare, Inc., which was based in Richardson, Texas. Created by Ed Schultz and Michael Mayer.

Reception
The game was reviewed in 1987 in Dragon #118 by Hartley and Patricia Lesser in "The Role of Computers" column. According to the reviewers, "OrbQuest is quite an enjoyable adventure — one that is not difficult to master, but that requires some modicum of thought." In a subsequent column, the reviewers gave the game 3 out of 5 stars. 

Macworld praises OrbQuest's large map, stating that "The best feature of OrbQuest is its grand scope: the great distances to be traveled and the exhaustive search, which is the essence of a good quest" but criticizes its unoriginality, expressing that "unfortunately, the game lacks imaginative twists. There is little need for strategic thinking. An experienced player may find OrbQuest too familiar, too straightforward, and derivative of more creative predecessors." Macworld follows this point by comparing OrbQuest to Ultima II and Ultima III, stating that they remain "a superior game in most respects" compared to OrbQuest. Despite these criticisms, Macworld calls OrbQuest "easy to understand, fun to play, and not an easy win", furthermore stating that "[OrbQuest] does not advance the art and science of digital adventuring but does offer a hide-and-seek game of substantial breadth."

MacUser gave OrbQuest a 4 out of 5 rating, describing it as a "very solid, very playable adventure game" with similar gameplay to Ultima, but lacking the sophistication of that series. MacUser praised the game's humor and creativity and noted its high degree of difficulty. In a 1995 retrospective review, Inside Mac Games called OrbQuest "a bright and imaginative (if not at times sneaky) and highly addictive game."

References

1986 video games
Classic Mac OS games
Classic Mac OS-only games
Role-playing video games
Video games developed in the United States